Austramathes fortis is a species of moth in the family Noctuidae. It is endemic to New Zealand and is found in both the North and the South Islands but has yet to be recorded at Stewart Island. It can be found in shrubland containing its host species at a range of altitudes from sea-level up to 1840 m. The larvae of this moth feed on several Melicytus species including M. crassifolius, M. alpinus, M. macrophyllus and M. novae-zelandiae. The larvae pupate in a cocoon of silk at the base of its host plant. It can take between 25 and 45 days before the adult moth emerges. Adults can be found on the wing during the months of July to March. The adults tend to be on the wing in twilight hours but have also been known to be active during the late afternoon. They are attracted to light but this behaviour may limit the number seen at light traps. The distinguishing feature of this moth is the curved black line at the base of its forewing. This species is unlikely to be confused with any other species in its range but it is very similar in appearance to A. squaliolus. However this latter species is only found on the Chatham Islands.

Taxonomy 

It was first described by Arthur Gardiner Butler in 1880 and named Toxocampa fortis. In 1903 George Hudson, believing he was describing a new species, named it Miselia iota. Edward Meyrick, in 1912, synonymised this name and placed this species within the Homohadena genus. In 1988 J. S. Dugdale in his catalogue of New Zealand Lepidoptera confirmed this placement. In 2017 Robert Hoare undertook a revision of New Zealand Noctuinae and placed this species in the Austramathes genus, as a result this species is now known as Austramathes fortis. The male holotype was collected by Mr Skellon in the Marlborough region and is held at the Natural History Museum, London.

Description 

The larvae of this species have two colour forms with one form being predominantly green coloured and the other being darkish grey. Hoare hypothesises that the latter form is likely to be more common as that colouration would assist the larva in camouflaging against the bark or base of its host plant. 

Butler originally described the adults of this species as:

George Hudson described the adults of this species as follows:

The wingspan of the male A. fortis is between 29 and 37 mm where as the wingspan of the female is between 29 and 41 mm. This species is unlikely to be confused with any other species in its range. The distinguishing feature for this species is the curved black line at the base of the forewing. It is however very similar in appearance to A. squaliolus but this latter species is only found on the Chatham Islands.

Distribution 
The species is endemic to New Zealand. It is found in both the North and the South Islands but has yet to be recorded at Stewart Island. It can be found in shrubland containing its host species at a range of altitudes from sea-level up to 1840 m. This species is regarded as uncommon but can be more numerous on the coast and on eastern islands.

Behaviour 
The larvae pupate in a cocoon of silk at the base of its host plant. It can take between 25 and 45 days before the adult moth emerges. Adults can be found on the wing during the months of July to March. The adults tend to be on the wing in twilight hours but have also been known to be active during the late afternoon. This behaviour may result in them not being collected as frequently via light trapping in the later evening hours. However this species is known to be attracted to light.

Host species 

The larvae of this moth has been shown to feed on several Melicytus species including M. crassifolius, M. alpinus, M. macrophyllus and M. novae-zelandiae.

References

Cuculliinae
Moths described in 1880
Moths of New Zealand
Endemic fauna of New Zealand
Taxa named by Arthur Gardiner Butler
Endemic moths of New Zealand